Choranthus is a genus of skippers in the family Hesperiidae.

Species
Recognised species in the genus Choranthus include:
 Choranthus antiqua (Herrich-Schäffer, 1863)
 Choranthus borincona (Watson, 1937) 
 Choranthus capucinus (Lucas, 1857)
 Choranthus haitensis Skinner, 1920
 Choranthus jamaicensis (Schaus, 1902)
 Choranthus lilliae E. Bell, 1931
 Choranthus melissa Gali, 1983
 Choranthus orientis (Skinner, 1920)
 Choranthus radians Lucas, 1857
 Choranthus richmondi Miller, [1966]
 Choranthus vitellius Fabricius, 1793

References

Natural History Museum Lepidoptera genus database

Hesperiini
Hesperiidae genera